Shirley G. Ardener is a pioneer of research on women (doing women’s studies more-or-less avant la lettre) and a committed anthropological researcher working with Bakweri people in Cameroon since the 1950s, initially with her husband Edwin Ardener (1927–1987).

Career
In 1964, she published an important analysis of forms of credit (Rotating credit associations) that has been influential on subsequent work on the informal economy and microcredit systems: see Rotating savings and credit association. Her work as editor has seen the publication of many key texts such as Perceiving Women, 1975. This collection also includes her essay Sexual Insult and Female Militancy, a foundational text demonstrating how the personal can be made deeply political.

She helped found and was the founding director of the Centre for Cross-Cultural Research on Women (CCCRW) at Queen Elizabeth House, Oxford informally since 1973, formally since 1983 (Davies and Waldren 2007: 252). The CCCRW has now become the International Gender Studies Centre (IGS) based at Lady Margaret Hall, Oxford.

She was the minute taker at the meeting that Dag Hammarskjöld had in Cameroon in the run up to independence in Cameroon on 2 January 1959.

Awards and honours 
Ardener won the Welcome Medal for Anthropology in 1962. She was awarded the OBE in 1991.

Selected publications 
 Perceiving Women (editor and contributor), Berg Publications, 1975	
 Defining Females (editor and contributor), Berg, 1978	
 Women and Space; ground rules and social maps (editor and contributor), Berg, 1981
 The Incorporated Wife (co-editor and contributor) Berg, 1984              	
 Visibility and Power, Essays on Women in Society and Development (co-editor, and contributor) OUP India, 1986
 Persons and Powers of Women (ed. and  contributor), Berg, 1992	
 Women and Missions, co-editor, Berg, 1993	
 Bilingual Women, co-editor, Berg, 1994	
 Money-Go-Rounds; women's use of rotating savings and credit associations (co-editor  and contributor), 1995	
 Kingdom on Mount Cameroon (annotated edition of papers by Edwin Ardener) Berghahn Books, 1996	
 Swedish Ventures in Cameroon; trade and travel; people and politics, 1883-1923, annotated edition of Knutson's memoirs. Berghahn Books, 2002	
 Changing Sex and Bending Gender (co-editor, and  contributor) Berghahn Books, 2005	
 Professional Identities; Policy and Practice in Business and Bureaucracy (co-editor) Berghahn Books, 2007	
 War and Women Across Continents (co-editor and contributor), Berghahn Books 2016

Notes

References

Sources
 Janette Davies and Jacqueline Waldren. "Gendering Oxford: Shirley Ardener and Cross-Cultural Research" in Identity and Networks: Gender and Ethnicity in a Cross-Cultural Context (Deborah Fahy Bryceson, Judith Okely, and Jonathan Webber, eds) (Berghahn Books; 2007)
 Cecillie Swaisland. "Shirley's African Roots" in Identity and Networks: Gender and Ethnicity in a Cross-Cultural Context (Deborah Fahy Bryceson, Judith Okely, and Jonathan Webber, eds) (Berghahn Books; 2007)

Further reading
Festschrift
 Deborah Fahy Bryceson, Judith Okely, and Jonathan Webber, eds. Identity and Networks (Berghahn Books). 
 Ian Fowler and Verkijika G. Fanso, eds. Encounter, Transformation and Identity: Peoples of the Western Cameroon Borderlands (Berghahn Books) 

Year of birth missing (living people)
Living people
British anthropologists
British women anthropologists
Women's studies academics
20th-century British non-fiction writers
21st-century British non-fiction writers
20th-century British women writers
21st-century British women writers